Zebs Creek is a stream in the U.S. state of West Virginia.

Zebs Creek was named after Zebe Cottarrall, a pioneer figure.

See also
List of rivers of West Virginia

References

Rivers of Barbour County, West Virginia
Rivers of Randolph County, West Virginia
Rivers of West Virginia